AEW Winter Is Coming is an annual professional wrestling television special produced by the American promotion All Elite Wrestling (AEW). Established in 2020, the event airs in December as a special episode of the promotion's flagship weekly television program, Wednesday Night Dynamite. The event's title is a reference to the motto in Game of Thrones, as well as its eponymous television episode. The show is distributed by Warner Bros. Discovery, the parent company of AEW's broadcast partners, TNT and TBS.

History
On the November 18, 2020, episode of Wednesday Night Dynamite, All Elite Wrestling (AEW) announced that the December 2 episode would be a special episode titled "Winter Is Coming". The phrase was the title of the pilot episode of the Game of Thrones television series, as well as the motto (or "Words") of House Stark of Winterfell in the series. The use of the title was approved by WarnerMedia officials, as WarnerMedia has used Dynamite to promote HBO Max and other WarnerMedia properties. The event was notable for the debut of former World Championship Wrestling (WCW) legend Sting in AEW, which was his first appearance on TNT in over 19 years since he defeated Ric Flair on the final episode of WCW Monday Nitro in March 2001. Due to the COVID-19 pandemic, the event was held at Daily's Place in Jacksonville, Florida.

On the November 19, 2021, episode of Friday Night Rampage, it was announced that a second Winter Is Coming would air as the December 15 episode of Dynamite. This established Winter Is Coming as an annual December television special of Dynamite. With AEW's return to live touring in July 2021, this second event was held at the Curtis Culwell Center in Garland, Texas. This would also be the final Winter Is Coming to air on TNT as in January 2022, Dynamite was moved to TNT's sister channel, TBS.

The third Winter Is Coming was scheduled to be held as the December 14, 2022, episode of Dynamite. It was also confirmed that the event would return to the Curtis Culwell Center in Garland, Texas.

Events

See also
List of All Elite Wrestling special events
List of AEW Dynamite special episodes

References

External links

Recurring events established in 2020
 
Game of Thrones